C. Jay Cox (born 1962 in Nevada) is a screenwriter and director.

Biography
Cox grew up in Eastern Nevada and made his first film when he was eight years old (a two-minute film noir called Vampire Cave). Growing up, he continued writing and creating short films. He graduated with a BA in Journalism from Brigham Young University. He then moved to Los Angeles (where he currently lives) and worked as an actor, performance artist, photographer and other jobs. He began making video shorts, industrial films and documentaries. After he wrote his screenplay for The Thing in Bob's Garage in 1998, he was given a number of jobs rewriting other people's screenplays. His own screenplay, Sweet Home Alabama, became a box office hit when the film, starring Reese Witherspoon, was released in 2002. His next film Latter Days, which he wrote, produced and directed, won him several audience awards at film festivals. The title Latter Days refers to the Church of Jesus Christ of Latter-day Saints. His familiarity with the subject matter came from his upbringing as a fifth-generation Mormon. When he moved to Los Angeles he came out as gay. The film is not autobiographical, but it is deeply personal. He directed and produced the 2008 film Kiss the Bride, starring Tori Spelling, and is a screenwriter for the 2009 film New in Town, starring Renée Zellweger and Harry Connick, Jr. He mentioned in a 2004 interview that some of his idols are James L. Brooks, Sydney Pollack and Billy Wilder.

Filmography

Actor
1987 Nightmare Sisters
1987 The Offspring

Director
1996 Get That Girl
1998 Reason Thirteen (Short)
2003 Latter Days
2008 Kiss the Bride

Writer
1998 Reason Thirteen  (short)
1998 The Governess
1998 The Thing in Bob's Garage
2002 Sweet Home Alabama
2003 Latter Days
2009 New in Town
2013 The Makeover (Hallmark Hall of Fame)

Awards
2003 Outie Award: Audience Award for Outstanding First Narrative Feature, for Latter Days
2003 Philadelphia International Gay & Lesbian Film Festival: Audience Award for Best Feature – Gay Male, for Latter Days
2004 Toronto Inside Out Lesbian and Gay Film and Video Festival: Audience Award for Best Feature Film or Video, for Latter Days

References

External links

 NY Times: Movies

1962 births
Living people
American film directors
American film producers
Former Latter Day Saints
Brigham Young University alumni
LGBT Latter Day Saints
LGBT people from Nevada